The 2010 World Seniors Championship (known for sponsorship reasons as the Wyldecrest Park Homes World Seniors Championship) was a snooker tournament that took place between 5–7 November 2010 at the Cedar Court Hotel in Bradford, England.

The event had last been held in 1991, when Cliff Wilson won in the final 5–4 against Eddie Charlton, to become the inaugural champion. Jimmy White won in the 2010 final 4–1 against Steve Davis and claimed his 30th career title.

Prize fund
The breakdown of prize money for this year is shown below:

Winner: £20,000 
Runner-up: £10,000
Semi-finalist: £4,000
Quarter-finalist: £2,500
Pre-qualifier: £2,000

Total: £50,000

Main draw
The draw for the quarter-finals was made on the afternoon of 5 November 2010 at the venue of the event. The draw for semi-finals was made on a random basis.

All matches up to and including the quarter-finals were best of 3 frames, semi-finals were best of 5 frames and the final was the best of 7 frames. All times are GMT.

Pre-qualifying
 Friday, 5 November
  Peter Ebdon 0–2  Nigel Bond

Quarter-finals

 Saturday, 6 November
  Ken Doherty 0–2  Nigel Bond
  Steve Davis 2–0  Joe Johnson

 Saturday, 6 November
  Dennis Taylor 0–2  John Parrott
  Jimmy White 2–0  Cliff Thorburn

Semi-finals

 Saturday, 6 November
  Steve Davis 3–1  Nigel Bond

 Sunday, 7 November
  John Parrott 2–3  Jimmy White

Final
 Sunday, 7 November
  Steve Davis 1–4  Jimmy White

Qualifying Tournament
These matches took place between 29 and 30 May 2010 at the Cue Garden, Bradford, England. There was only one century break in qualifying - a 144 made by Peter Lines.

References

2010
World Seniors Championship
World Seniors Championship
World Seniors Championship
Sport in Bradford